is the ninth single of J-pop singer, Sachi Tainaka. It was released on October 22, 2008. "Mata Ashita ne" was used as the ending theme for the ANB drama Selection X The Museum and for NTV drama Prin-ce 2 making this her third tie-in with the said series. "code" was used as the theme song for the game Fate/unlimited codes, which is related to the anime series, Fate/stay night where she has many tie-ins. "TOMORROW" is a Mayo Okamoto cover song.

The CD's catalog number is GNCX-0016.

Track listing
Mata Ashita ne
Composition/Lyrics: Sachi Tainaka
Arrangement: Masato Minakawa
code
Lyrics: Matsumura Ryuuji
Composition/Arrangement: Yuusuke Itagaki
TOMORROW
Lyrics: Mayo Okamoto, Mana Anju
Composition: Mayo Okamoto
Arrangement: Masato Minakawa
Mata Ashita ne -instrumental-
code -instrumental-

References

2008 singles
Sachi Tainaka songs